"You Can't Do Me" was the first single of Madeleine Peyroux's fourth solo album - Bare Bones - and it hit the radio stations on January 26, 2009. The music was written by Walter Becker and Larry Klein with lyrics by Peyroux. The song was produced by Larry Klein; it begins with an insistent piano chord. No video was produced to accompany the track.

References

2009 songs
Songs written by Madeleine Peyroux
Songs written by Larry Klein
Songs written by Walter Becker
Rounder Records singles